The Big West Conference Men's Basketball Coach of the Year is an annual college basketball award presented to the top men's basketball coach in the Big West Conference.

Winners

Winners by school

Notes

References 

NCAA Division I men's basketball conference coaches of the year
Coach Of The Year
Awards established in 1978